Hamar katedralskole is an upper secondary school in Hamar, Norway.

History
Founded in 1153 as Schola cathedralis hamarensis, it is the second oldest school in Norway together with Bergen katedralskole and Oslo katedralskole, which were founded the same year, one year after the founding of Trondheim katedralskole. Hamar Cathedral School was founded by Cardinal Nicolas Breakspear, later to become Pope Adrian IV (c. 1100 – 1159).  

With the Protestant Reformation,  Hamar Diocese was closed and in 1602 and the school was  merged with Oslo Cathedral School.
The school remained closed until 1876, when it was reopened under the name Hamar offentlige skole for høyere allmenndannelse. The old name was reintroduced in 1936. The current headmaster is Stig Johannessen.

Notable alumni
 Nils Collett Vogt (1864–1937), writer
 Per Imerslund (1912–1943), writer
 Sigurd Evensmo (1912–1978), writer
 Ivar Giæver (1929–), physicist and Nobel Prize in Physics laureate
 Knut Faldbakken (1941–), writer
 Dag Fornæss (1948–) speed skater
 John Erik Fornæss (1946–) mathematician, Princeton University
 Morten Andreas Meyer (1959–), politician
 Jan Åge Fjørtoft (1967–), football player
 Matias Faldbakken (1973–), writer and artist
 Anette Trettebergstuen (1981–), politician
 Anders Baasmo Christiansen (1976-), actor
 Lasse Sætre (1974-), speed skater

Gallery

References

External links
 School website

Secondary schools in Norway
Cathedral schools
Educational institutions established in the 12th century
Education in Hamar
Hedmark County Municipality